Baldissero Canavese is a comune (municipality) in the Metropolitan City of Turin in the Italian region Piedmont, about  north of Turin.

Baldissero Canavese borders the following municipalities: Castellamonte, Vistrorio, Vidracco, Strambinello, and Torre Canavese.

References

Cities and towns in Piedmont